Utetheisa amhara is a moth in the family Erebidae. It was described by Karl Jordan in 1939. It is found in Eritrea, Ethiopia, Kenya, Saudi Arabia, Somalia and the United Arab Emirates.

References

Moths described in 1939
amhara